Mati may refer to:

Geography
Mati, Davao Oriental, Philippines, a city
Roman Catholic Diocese of Mati
Mati Protected Landscape, a protected area in Davao Oriental, Philippines
Mati Airport, Davao Oriental, Philippines 
Mati, a barangay in San Miguel, Zamboanga del Sur, Philippines
Mati, Greece, a holiday resort village on the east coast of the Attica region, 29 kilometres east of Athens
Mati, Nepal, a village development committee in Dolakha District, Janakpur Zone
Mati, Lucknow, a village in Uttar Pradesh, India
 Mat (river), a river in Albania
 Mat (region), a region in Albania

People
 Mati (given name)
 Fred Mbiti Gideon Mati, Kenyan politician

Other uses
Ma-Ti, character from the Captain Planet and the Planeteers TV series
Moscow State Aviation Technological University (MATI)
Mati Community College, Davao Oriental, Philippines
Mati, original title of the 1977 film Beyond Reason

See also
 Matti (disambiguation)
 Matis (disambiguation)
 Maty (disambiguation)